Pehlivanköy is a town and district of Kırklareli Province in the Marmara region of Turkey. The population of the town was 2,007 in 2010.

References

External links
 District governor's official website 

Populated places in Kırklareli Province
 
Pomak communities in Turkey